is a former Japanese football player.

Playing career
Kina was born in Naha on December 10, 1976. After graduating from high school, he joined Nagoya Grampus Eight in 1995. He debuted in 1995 and played many matches as central midfielder from 1996. However he could not play at all in the match for injury from 1998. In 2000, he moved to newly-promoted club FC Tokyoin the J1 League. He played as a central midfielder. However, the arrival of Masashi Miyazawa in 2002 limited his chances and in 2004, he moved to J2 League club Omiya Ardija. He tried his luck with two more J2 sides, Avispa Fukuoka and Tokyo Verdy, without much success. In 2007, he moved to Japan Football League club Rosso Kumamoto (later Roasso Kumamoto). He played regularly as the club was promoted to the J2 League in 2008. In 2010, he moved to Regional League club Okinawa Kaiho Bank. He retired at the end of the 2011 season.

Managerial career
On the 20 October 2021, Kina was appointed manager of FC Ryukyu.

Club statistics

References

External links

1976 births
Living people
Association football people from Okinawa Prefecture
Japanese footballers
J1 League players
J2 League players
Japan Football League players
Nagoya Grampus players
FC Tokyo players
Omiya Ardija players
Avispa Fukuoka players
Tokyo Verdy players
Roasso Kumamoto players
Association football midfielders
Japanese football managers
J2 League managers
FC Ryukyu managers